Kimberly Jonelle 'Kimee' Balmilero (born December 13, 1979) is an American actress and singer of Filipino descent.

Early life and education
She is the daughter of Roy Balmilero who appears in Hawaii Five-0 portrayed as Noelani's father Joseph Cunha. Balmilero graduated from James B. Castle High School, home of the Castle Performing Arts Center on Oahu. In high school, she worked on a dinner cruise, singing and dancing for the customers and was a member of 24VII Honolulu Dance Company.

Career
Balmilero left Hawaii at 17 and joined the second national touring company of Miss Saigon. After touring for almost three years she moved to San Francisco to study at Studio A.C.T. for six months. Balmilero then moved to New York City and was part of the Original Broadway Cast of Mamma Mia!

In 2003, Balmilero joined the three-time Emmy nominated TV series Hi-5, the American counterpart to the Australian kid's show of the same name.

Filmography

Film

Television

References

 cbs.com Hawai Five-0 Cast Profile
 Pacific Business News "40 Under 40" Award
 Quote Unquote: Improv Your Life with “Hawai‘i Five-0” Actress Kimee Balmilero
 AArisings A-Profiler Interview
 Midweek Hawaii Cover Story
 The Star-Toronto Interview

External links
 Kimee's Official Website
 Kimee's Honolulu Improv Company and Learning Center
 Kimee's Hawaii S-Corp, Kimeejay, Inc.
 The Hawaii Sketch Comedy Festival
 Stagefish (Kimee's Theatre Production Company)
 
 

1979 births
Actresses from Hawaii
American film actresses
American people of Filipino descent
American stage actresses
American television actresses
American children's musicians
Living people
21st-century American women